Ryan Sailor (born November 27, 1998) is an American professional soccer player who plays as a defender for Major League Soccer club Inter Miami.

Career

Youth & College
Ryan Sailor attended Arapahoe High School in Centennial, CO. He played club soccer for Real Colorado who he helped lead to the Region IV semi-finals and the Colorado state club championship in 2013. Sailor served as Real Colorado's team captain in United States Development Academy play from 2013-2016. 

Sailor attended the University of Washington to play college soccer from 2016-2021. He saw limited action during first three years at Washington, redshirting his freshman season and only making two appearances from 2016 to 2018. Sailor saw significantly higher action during his final three seasons at Washington, going on to finish his Husky career with 49 total appearances which included 10 goals and 3 assists. His final season in 2021 saw Sailor named as the Pac-12 Defensive Player of the Year, 1st Team All-Conference for the PAC-12, 1st Team All-America, and a semi-finalist for the MAC Herman Trophy. During his final three seasons, Sailor captained the Huskies to three consecutive NCAA Elite 8 appearances and ended his career as the runner up in the 2021 College Cup National Championship to the Clemson Tigers.

During his time at college, Sailor was named to the roster for USL PDL side Colorado Rapids U23, but didn't make an appearance for the team.

Professional
On January 11, 2022, Sailor was selected 9th overall in the 2022 MLS SuperDraft by Inter Miami CF. He signed with the Major League Soccer club on February 22, 2022. Sailor made his MLS debut on May 7, 2022, starting in a 1–0 loss away to Charlotte FC.

References

External links

 

1998 births
Living people
All-American men's college soccer players
American soccer players
Association football defenders
Colorado Rapids U-23 players
Inter Miami CF II players
Inter Miami CF draft picks
Inter Miami CF players
Major League Soccer players
MLS Next Pro players
People from Highlands Ranch, Colorado
Soccer players from Colorado
Washington Huskies men's soccer players